The Journey to Miracle River is the third studio album by singer Amy Holland, who was now in her 50s the time this album was released. This is her first studio album in 25 years, but she did record songs in between the years 1983-2008, such as songs for film soundtracks and other collaborations. This album was released under the Chonin Records label, with Bernie Chiaravalle being the producer for the album. Holland and Chiaravalle have written some songs for the album, but the first track on the album is a cover of a Robben Ford song called "Don't Lose Your Faith in Me". This also marked Holland's return to the music industry after a battle with breast cancer, which she was diagnosed with since 1995. Holland wrote most of the songs for this album.

Track listing

2008 albums
Amy Holland albums